Choi Ae-Yeong (25 July 1959 – 14 May 2008) is a South Korean former basketball player who competed in the 1984 Summer Olympics.

References

1959 births
2008 deaths
South Korean women's basketball players
Olympic basketball players of South Korea
Basketball players at the 1984 Summer Olympics
Olympic silver medalists for South Korea
Olympic medalists in basketball
Medalists at the 1984 Summer Olympics